Newcomb–Tulane College, located in New Orleans in the U.S. state of Louisiana, is the academic home for all of Tulane University's full-time undergraduate students.  The College was founded in 2005 to maximize Tulane's use of resources by combining the administrative functions of the all-male Tulane College with the administrative functions of the all-female H. Sophie Newcomb Memorial College.

Scope

Students enrolled in the college pursue programs and degrees offered by the five schools offering classes to undergraduates:

Tulane School of Architecture
Freeman School of Business
Tulane University School of Liberal Arts
Tulane University School of Public Health and Tropical Medicine
Tulane University School of Science and Engineering

See also
H. Sophie Newcomb Memorial College
Tulane University

References

External links
Official website

Tulane University
Educational institutions established in 2005
2005 establishments in Louisiana